Hyleorus is a genus of flies in the family Tachinidae.

Species
Meleterus montanus Aldrich, 1926
Meleterus nuperus Reinhard, 1956

References

Dexiinae
Tachinidae genera
Diptera of North America
Taxa named by John Merton Aldrich